The Flag of Chola or Tiger Flag was used by the Tamil Chola dynasty. The Tiger or Jumping Tiger was the royal emblem of the Cholas and was depicted on coins, seals and banners. On the coins of Uttama Chola, the Chola Tiger was shown sitting between the twin fish of Pandya and the bow of Chera. The flag of Chola is mentioned in Periya Puranam, which was compiled during the 12th century by Sekkizhar.

The Periya Puranam has following mention about Chola flag:

Contemporary derivatives
The Flag of Tamil Eelam was inspired by the Chola flag.

See also 
 Flag of Pandya
 Flag of Pallava
 Flags of Tamils

References 

Chola
Chola
Flags displaying animals